Sanwar Lal Jat (1 January 1955 – 9 August 2017) was the chairman of Rajasthan Kisan Aayog and MP of constituency from Ajmer, Rajasthan. He was also a cabinet minister in the Government of Rajasthan. He held portfolios of irrigation, Indira Gandhi Nahar Pariyojana, PHED, CAD, Ground Water Dev. He won election to Rajasthan Legislative Assembly from Nasirabad, Ajmer in Ajmer district. He was a senior leader of state Bharatiya Janata Party.

He was born in 1955 and educated to M Com and Ph.D. He was a professor before entering politics. He was married to Narbada and they have two sons and a daughter together. He died on 9 August 2017 in Delhi.

Career
Jat served as Minister of State for Water Resources from November 2014 to July 2016.

References

|-

External links 
Prof. Sanwarlal Jat
Sanwar Lal Jat biography

Rajasthani politicians
1955 births
2017 deaths
People from Ajmer district
State cabinet ministers of Rajasthan
India MPs 2014–2019
Lok Sabha members from Rajasthan
Bharatiya Janata Party politicians from Rajasthan
Narendra Modi ministry
Deaths from kidney failure